The Pocket Dwellers are a Canadian seven-member experimental hip-hop group from the Toronto area. The band's main genre is hip-hop, but their music is influenced by jazz, funk, soul and breakbeat.

History
The Pocket Dwellers began forming together in 1996.   That year the band performed at EdgeFest in Toronto. In 1999 the band performed in Hamilton as part of Showcase '99.

The Pocket Dwellers released their first full-length record in 2000 after they signed a recording deal with Song Corp, and a second album, Digitally Organic, later that year. Song Corp went bankrupt in early 2001, leaving the second album with no promotion.

The next release was the album recorded live during sold out performances at a club in Toronto called the Reverb.  The recording was released under Urbnet records.

In 2005 they signed with Blue Note/EMI and released PD-Atrics.  The recording was more hip hop based and involved less live instrumentation than had been employed in the past.  In 2006 the band was nominated for a Juno award for best new group.

Members
Dennis Passley "Deknow" – tenor saxophone
Nigel Williams "N.I.Gel" – vocals
John Griffith "Quest" – saxophone, flute
Marco Raposo "Red" – drums
Gord Shields "Jupiter" – bass guitar
Christian McKibbin "Holy C" – guitar
Sheldon Moore "S-luv" – turntables
 guest musicians:
Brownman Ali – trumpet

Discography

Albums
 Limited Edition - EP (1998)
 Digitally Organic (August 29, 2002)
 Lifecheck (August 19, 2003)
 PD-Atrics (October 4, 2005)
 Conception: The Mix Tape Volume 2 (2005)

References

Pocket Dwellers at allmusic.com

Canadian experimental musical groups
Musical groups established in 1996
Canadian hip hop groups
Musical groups from Toronto
1996 establishments in Ontario